Happy's Party was a children's TV program originating at WDTV in Pittsburgh, Pennsylvania and broadcast for one season on the DuMont Television Network.

The show debuted locally on March 1, 1951, and appears to have had its last telecast on August 13, 1955 (by which time WDTV had been purchased by Westinghouse and become KDKA-TV). It was carried by the DuMont network from September 6, 1952, until May 16, 1953, with 30 minutes on the network and an additional 30 minutes broadcast to the local Pittsburgh market.  It also appears to have aired on WQED in Pittsburgh in 1959.  Happy was a dog puppet which interacted with host Ida Mae Maher (died July 3, 1969).
Ida Mae Maher also made public-service appearances at elementary school classrooms in the Pittsburgh area. She used a puppet named, "Happy Tooth", to encourage young children to practice good dental hygiene.

Episode status

No episodes were believed to have survived. In 2015, however, Clarke Ingram, creator of the DuMont historical website, announced he had located a partial show.  This fragment, which aired on February 5, 1955 (just six days after WDTV changed to KDKA-TV), is the only known existing footage of the program. In 2019, this footage was digitized and uploaded to YouTube.  The original film now resides at the UCLA Film and Television Archive.

List of programs broadcast by the DuMont Television Network
List of surviving DuMont Television Network broadcasts
List of local children's television seriesAll About Baby (1953–55), originating from WGN-TV in ChicagoKids and Company (1951–52)The Most Important People (1950–51), sponsored by Gerber's Baby Food

References

Bibliography
David Weinstein, The Forgotten Network: DuMont and the Birth of American Television (Philadelphia: Temple University Press, 2004) 
Alex McNeil, Total Television, Fourth edition (New York: Penguin Books, 1980) 
Tim Brooks and Earle Marsh, The Complete Directory to Prime Time Network TV Shows'', Third edition (New York: Ballantine Books, 1964)

External links
Happy's Party at IMDB
DuMont historical website 

DuMont Television Network original programming
1952 American television series debuts
1953 American television series endings
1950s American children's television series
American television shows featuring puppetry
Black-and-white American television shows